Salesian English School may refer to:
Salesian English School (Secondary Section)
Salesian English School (Primary Section)